Carr Baker Neel (1873-1949) was an American male tennis player who was active in the late 19th century.

Tennis career
In 1896 Carr Neel won the men's doubles title at the U.S. National Championships. Together with his brother Sam Neel they were victorious over defending champions Robert Wrenn and Malcolm Chace.

In 1896 he won the Western Tennis Championship beating George Wrenn in the final.  In 1899 he again won the tournament by defeating John Allen in the final and winning against Kreigh Collins in the challenge round. They were the first Californians to win a title at the U.S. Championships.

Neel was a double winner of the Niagara International Tennis Tournament. He won the title in 1895 and successfully defended it in the 1896 Challenge Round against Fritz K. Ward in straight sets.

Grand Slam finals

Doubles (1 titles, 1 runner-up)

References

19th-century American people
19th-century male tennis players
United States National champions (tennis)
Grand Slam (tennis) champions in men's doubles
1873 births
1949 deaths
American male tennis players
Tennis people from Missouri